Biruwa is a Village council in Syangja District in Gandaki Province, central Nepal.

History
On 12 March 2017, the government of Nepal implemented a new local administrative structure consisting of 744 local units. With the implementation of the new local administrative structure, VDCs have been replaced with municipal & village councils. Biruwa is one of these 744 local units. Biruwa is created by merging Biruwa Archale, (4-8) Wards of Rangvang, (3-9) Wards of Pelkachaur, Oraste, Manakamana, (1-6) Wards of Chinnebas & (1-5,7) wards of Kichnas.

Political situation
Biruwa is divided into 8 Wards. It is surrounded by Putalibazar at northern side, Harinas & Tanahun District from east, Bhirkot & Waling from west and Chapakot at south. Biruwa Archale is its headquarter.

Population
As Biruwa is created by merging Biruwa Archale, (4-8) Wards of Rangvang, (3,9) Wards of Pelkachaur, Oraste, Manakamana, (1-6) Wards of Chinnebas & (1-5,7) wards of Kichnas. The sum population of Biruwa, 18,413, is residing in an area of 95.79 km2.

References

See also

Populated places in Syangja District
Rural municipalities in Syangja District
Syangja District
Rural municipalities of Nepal established in 2017